Pigeon House may refer to:
A dovecote
The former Pigeon House generating station in Dublin, Ireland: see Poolbeg Generating Station